Scottish usually refers to something of, from, or related to Scotland, including:

Scottish Gaelic, a Celtic Goidelic language of the Indo-European language family native to Scotland
Scottish English
Scottish national identity, the Scottish identity and common culture
Scottish people, a nation and ethnic group native to Scotland
Scots language, a West Germanic language spoken in lowland Scotland
Symphony No. 3 (Mendelssohn), a symphony by Felix Mendelssohn known as the Scottish

See also
Scotch (disambiguation)
Scotland (disambiguation)
Scots (disambiguation)
Scottian (disambiguation)
Schottische

 
Language and nationality disambiguation pages

ca:Escocès